{{Speciesbox 
| image =
| genus = Gloydius
| species = himalayanus
| authority = (Günther, 1864)
| synonyms = * Trigonocephalus affinis – Günther, 1860 (part)
 Halys himalayanus Günther, 1864 Halys Himalayanus – Stoliczka, 1870
 Halys Hymalayanus  Stoliczka, 1870 (ex errore)
 Trigonocephalus himalayanus – Strauch, 1873
 Crotalus Halys Himalayanus – Higgins, 1873
 Ancistrodon himalayanus – Boulenger, 1890
 Agkistrodon himalayanus – Hatta, 1928
 A[gkistrodon]. himalayana – Underwood, 1979
 Gloydius himalayanus – Hoge & Romano-Hoge, 1981
}}Gloydius himalayanus also known as the Himalayan pit viper or the Himalayan viperis a venomous pitviper species found along the southern slopes of the Himalayas in Pakistan, India and Nepal. No subspecies are currently recognized. Himalayan pit vipers have been found up to 4900m above sea level, which makes it the highest living snake ever found.

Description
Its body color is light brown or dark brown. On the upper side of the body there are long infarct marks which seem to be intertwined due to their close proximity. Slightly larger, side row of spots of the same color. Dark spots on the head, abdomen is light gray in color. There are small dark spots on the abdomen.

The head is distinctly wide and elongated, with symmetrically arranged large scales. The dorsal scales are strongly keeled. An elongated postocular extends anteriorly to separate the eye from the supralabials. The dorsum is brownish, mottled or variegated to form a pattern of transverse bars. Ventral scales are white with black and red dots or speckles. Dorsal scale count is "(20 to 23) - 21 (19 to 23) - 17 (15)", which means behind head, 20-23 rows; at midbody, usually 21 rows, but sometimes 19 or 23; just before vent, usually 17 rows, but sometimes 15.

Distribution
Occurs along the southern slopes of the Himalayas from northeastern Pakistan, to northern India (Jammu and Kashmir, Punjab, Ladakh and Uttarakhand) and Nepal. Reports that this species occurs in Sikkim, India, need to be confirmed. It is the only pit viper found in Pakistan .

Habitat
It takes refuge under fallen timber, crevices, in or under rocks, beneath boulders, ledges, stones and fallen leaves.

Behavior and diet
This is a nocturnal and terrestrial species, often seen close to its hiding place, to which it retreats when disturbed. It is a lazy timid snake, moving slowly from one place to another. Its food consists mostly of millipedes, centipedes, and small rodents.

Venom
Bites from this species result in intense local pain and swelling, which usually subsides within two to three days, even without treatment.

References

Further reading

 Gloyd HK, Conant R. 1990. Snakes of the Agkistrodon Complex. A Monographic Review. Society for the Study of Amphibians and Reptiles. Contributions to Herpetology No. 6. SSAR, Oxford, Ohio. vi + 614 pp. + 52 pl.
 Gumprecht A, Tillack F, Orlov NL, Captain A, Ryabow S. 2004. Asian Pit Vipers. Geitje Books. Berlin. 368 pp.
 Günther A. 1864. The Reptiles of British India. The Ray Society. (Taylor & Francis, Printers). London. xxvii + 452 pp. (Halys himalayanus'', pp. 393–394.)

External links
 
 Himalayan Pit Viper Gloydius himalayanus at Wildlife of Pakistan. Accessed 20 May 2007.

himalayanus
Reptiles of Pakistan
Reptiles of India
Reptiles of Nepal
Taxa named by Albert Günther
Reptiles described in 1864